Adelphius or Adelfius may refer to:

  (4th century), Egyptian bishop
 Clodius Celsinus Adelphius (fl. 333–351), Roman politician
 Adelfius, a bishop from Britain noted as attending the 314 Council of Arles
 Adelfius I (bishop of Limoges) (. ), grandfather of St Ruricius
 Adelphius of Poitiers, bishop
 Adelfius II (bishop of Limoges)
 Adelfius III (bishop of Limoges)

See also
 Adelphus, bishop of Metz
 Adelfer
 Adelfia
 Adelfo
 Adelpha
 Adelphi (disambiguation)
 Adelphia (disambiguation)